Jamie Broadnax (born 24 April 1980) is a film critic, podcaster and writer, known for founding and being editor-in-chief and CEO of the Black Girl Nerds community.

Biography
Broadnax, who has a master's degree in Film and Marketing, and started her career in film, by working on several film shoots in various positions. Broadnax became a film critic, is a member of the Broadcast Film Critics Association, and as a freelance writer about films has written for numerous publications, including HuffPost, the New York Post, Variety, and Vulture.com.

Broadnax has hosted panel discussions, including the panel at the A Wrinkle in Time premiere and the Sorry to Bother You panel at the 2018 Sundance Film Festival. She has also co-hosted the "Misty Knight's Uninformed Afro" podcast about black superheroines, and in April 2017, she co-launched the #NoConfederate hashtag campaign in response to HBO's plan to produce a series - Confederate - with the premise "What if the Confederacy never lost?". In an October 2015 guest appearance on the Melissa Harris-Perry TV program, Broadnax talked about diversity in comics and at New York Comic Con.

In 2014, Broadnax was accredited by MSNBC's The Grio 100. She has been described as "one of the biggest up-and-coming names in black-nerd pop culture" (by The Root's Jason Johnson) and as "one of the most important makers of 2016" (by Paste's Shannon M. Houston).

Mid 2018, after co-founding "Universal FanCon" and running a successful Kickstarter campaign for the convention, Broadnax was caught up in the controversy surrounding the convention being cancelled and she then released a public statement and stepped back temporarily from a leadership role to regroup.

Black Girl Nerds
Black Girl Nerds initially started as a Blogspot journal, where Broadnax wrote about various topics, including her own online dating experiences. In 2013, Black Weblog Awards awarded Black Girl Nerds "Best Podcast". The community gradually became more mainstream, in particular after a shout-out by Shonda Rhimes in the September 2014 issue of Marie Claire. In October 2015, HuffPost named Black Girl Nerds one of the leading Black Podcasts. Late 2017, its website had over 200,000 monthly visitors.

See also
 Geek girl
 Minority group

References

External links
 
 
 Black Girl Nerds

1980 births
Living people
People from Portsmouth, Virginia
American columnists
American film critics
Writers from Virginia
21st-century American journalists
20th-century American women writers
21st-century American women writers
American women journalists